Fudge Tunnel were an English rock band formed in Nottingham by Alex Newport, David Ryley and Adrian Parkin. They were known for straddling noise rock and metal.

History
After two singles on Pigboy/Vinyl Solution Records ("Fudge Tunnel" in 1989, "The Sweet Sound of Excess" in 1990), they signed to Nottingham's Earache Records. Their debut album was Hate Songs in E Minor, which attracted a large amount of press interest, after the original album artwork was confiscated by the Nottingham Vice Squad.

Fudge Tunnel's reputation was built around their massive guitar sound and ironic sense of humour, and were popular with the British music press - at least at first. The band's first release was "Single of the Week" in NME magazine in January 1990, with NME declaring "Absolutely and totally the best single ever to be released in 1990. Total nine guitar attack-rock".

The band undertook several European tours in 1991 and 1992 including support slots with Fugazi, Silverfish and The Jesus Lizard, as well as support slots with Swervedriver, Godflesh, and regular performances at popular London venues The Camden Falcon and Camden Underworld.

Two more albums were to follow in 1993 (Creep Diets) and 1994 (The Complicated Futility of Ignorance). Newport also was active with Nailbomb, a collaboration with Max Cavalera (Sepultura), who released one studio album and one live album of their Dynamo Open Air Festival performance.

After the release of their third studio album, the band split up. David Ryley ran his label BGR Records for a while. Adrian Parkin played with Tubesurfer until 1996 when they too split up, and then returned to being a quantity surveyor in Bolton.  Alex Newport went on to pursue a successful career as a producer/mixer and now lives and runs his own studio in New York. He has produced albums by At the Drive-In, The Mars Volta, Bloc Party, City and Colour, and many others. He also formed the band Theory of Ruin, who released one album, Counter Culture Nosebleed and the Frontline Poster Child EP, both on Escape Artist Records and currently is playing in Red Love with Matt Tong.

Discography

Singles and EPs
 "Fudge Tunnel" (Pigboy/Vinyl Solution, 1989)
 "The Sweet Sound of Excess" (Pigboy/Vinyl Solution, 1990)
 "Teeth" (Earache/Relativity, 1992)
 "The Joy of Irony" (Earache, 1994)

Albums
 Hate Songs in E Minor (Earache/Relativity, 1991)
 Creep Diets (Earache/Columbia, 1993, MOSH64)
 The Complicated Futility of Ignorance (Earache, 1994)

Compilation albums
 "Fudgecake" (Pigboy/Vinyl solution/Cargo, 1992)
 Grey - Dining Hall Classics (Sony, 1993)
 In a Word (Earache, 1994)
 Whore - Various Artists Play Wire (WMO, 1996)

References

External links
[ Fudge Tunnel biography on AMG]
Alex Newport's website
Alex Newport's recording studio

English rock music groups
English grunge groups
Sludge metal musical groups
British musical trios
Earache Records artists
Political music groups
British alternative metal musical groups
English noise rock groups
Musical groups from Nottingham